The Sinhalese Sports Club Ground is the headquarters of Sri Lanka Cricket, the controlling body of cricket in Sri Lanka. The ground is sometimes described as "the Lord's of Sri Lanka". The first One Day International match played on the ground was in 1982 against England and it staged its first Test match in 1984 against the touring New Zealand side. The first Twenty20 International played on the ground was in 2010 when Canada faced Ireland.

In cricket, a five-wicket haul (also known as a "five-for" or "fifer") refers to a bowler taking five or more wickets in a single innings. This is regarded as a notable achievement. This article details the five-wicket hauls taken on the ground in official international Test and One Day International matches.

The first bowler to take a five-wicket haul in an international match on the ground was Sri Lanka's Ravi Ratnayeke, who took five wickets for the cost of 42 runs (5/42) against New Zealand in the first Test on the ground. The best innings bowling figures in Test matches on the ground were taken by fellow Sri Lankan Rangana Herath, who took 9/127 against Pakistan in 2014. The first five-wicket haul in an ODI on the ground was achieved by Chaminda Vaas who took 8/19 for Sri Lanka against Zimbabwe in 2001.  this is the only time a bowler has taken eight wickets in an innings in any ODI on any ground.

Key

Test match five-wicket hauls

Five-wicket hauls have been taken a total of 52 times in Test matches on the ground.

One Day International five-wicket hauls

There have been three five-wicket hauls taken on the ground in One Day Internationals, all of them in men's matches.

Notes

References

External links
 Five-wicket hauls at Sinhalese Sports Club Ground, CricInfo

Sri Lankan cricket lists
Sinhalese Sports Club Ground